Otto Steinhäusl (10 March 1879 – 20 June 1940) was an Austrian-born SS-Oberführer, Polizeipräsident (Police President) of Vienna, and President of Interpol (1938–1940).

Early career
Steinhäusl served as Vienna's head of police and Polizeipräsident starting in the early 1930s. It is also believed to be the time which he joined the underground Austrian SS. Otto Strasser alleged that Steinhäusl was a secret Gestapo agent, and that in July 1933 there was an operation orchestrated by Steinhäusl to either kidnap Strasser, and smuggle him across the German frontier, or imprison him. However, the attempt met with failure.

In the aftermath of the assassination of Austrian Chancellor Engelbert Dollfuss on 25 July 1934, Steinhäusl was found to be one of the conspirators. He was sentenced to a long term of imprisonment.

Anschluss and reinstatement
On the morning of 12 March 1938, the 8th Army of the German Wehrmacht crossed the German-Austrian border. They did not face resistance by the Austrian Army—on the contrary, the German troops were greeted by cheering Austrians with Hitler salutes, Nazi flags and flowers. Due to this, the Nazi invasion is also called the Blumenkrieg (war of flowers). By noon on the same day, Reichsführer-SS Heinrich Himmler removed the current President of Interpol, Dr. Michael Skubl, who would later be replaced by Steinhäusl, who had just been released from prison. Steinhäusl was reinstated as Polizeipräsident of Vienna, and promoted to SS-Standartenführer on the day of the Anschluss.

Polizeipräsident of Vienna and President of Interpol
As Polizeipräsident of Vienna, Steinhäusl conspired with two higher leaders of the Austrian SS, Fridolin Glass and Josef Fitzthum, to retain the existing force structure of the Austrian police. Hoping to preempt a massive reorganization that might place their own careers in jeopardy, they persuaded the chief of Ordnungspolizei, Kurt Daluege, to refrain from a purge, claiming that most of the detectives, policemen, and even neighborhood patrolmen had been illegal Nazi activists before the Anschluss. Daluege was sceptical but agreed to wait until evidence could be organized and scrutinized. The response was the concoction of fraudulent documents that included backdated membership cards, forged dossiers, fabricated reports, and a host of other laundered or counterfeit items. By September 1938 nearly 1,000 policemen were officially confirmed to have been activists, of whom 700 were also admitted into the SS.

As sociologist Mathieu Deflem writes, "Steinhäusl became the new International Criminal Police Commission President in April 1938. Not only was Steinhäusl’s loyalty to Germany secure, German leaders also reckoned he would be but an interim figure, as he was known to suffer from tuberculosis. The first meeting under Steinhäusl’s Presidency, in Bucharest in 1938, produced only one unanimous decision: that the next meeting was to be held in Berlin. A preliminary program for the Berlin meeting was drafted, a copy has survived in the FBI files on Interpol, but, as noted, the meeting was canceled."

Death and aftermath
Steinhäusl, a long-time sufferer of tuberculosis, died on 20 June 1940 in Vienna. He was 61 years old.

Secretary General of Interpol, Oskar Dressler sent a report to all ICPC members which specified that he and other police, including Nazi officials Arthur Nebe and others, had decided “to request the Chief of the German Security Police” to accept the Presidency of the ICPC. Reportedly, twenty-seven police officials representing 15 states consented to the suggestion. Because this was less than two-thirds of the total ICPC membership, the countries that could not be addressed were not counted and those that had abstained were considered as not voting against the motion, so that, the Nazi controlled ICPC leadership reasoned, the necessary majority was reached. In a circular letter of 24 August 1940, Reinhard Heydrich declared that he had been informed that his candidacy as ICPC President had "passed unanimously." Heydrich continued that he would "lead the Commission into a new and successful future" and that the ICPC headquarters would “from now on be located in Berlin”.

Summary of SS career

Dates of rank
 SS#292773
 SS-Standartenführer: 12 March 1938
 SS-Oberführer: 25 July 1938

Notable decorations
 Anschluss Medal (1938)

See also
 Interpol

References

1879 births
1940 deaths
Austrian Nazi lawyers
20th-century deaths from tuberculosis
Austrian police officers
Interpol officials
SS and Police Leaders
SS-Oberführer
People from České Budějovice
German Bohemian people
Tuberculosis deaths in Austria